Miroslav Nemec (born 26 September 1971) is a Slovak football manager and former football player. He last served as the manager of Zemplín Michalovce.

Player career 
Miroslav Nemec's football career began at Agrostav Sásová where he played since he was twelve years old and lasted until the beginning of his compulsory military service. During compulsory military service he played for "B" team Dukla Banská Bystrica. After finishing compulsory military service he played for TJ Selce (the third league). From 1996, he has played at following teams: Tatran Prešov, 1. FC Košice, DAC Dunajská Streda, F.C. Ironi Ashdod (Israel), MŠK Žilina, Matador Púchov, FK Atyrau (Kazakhstan), and FC Ekibastuzets (Kazakhstan). After his return from Kazakhstan he retired from his active football career in 1996. During the 2011/2012 season, he was a member of the TOP Eleven ObFZ Žilina.

After he quit his football career he switched to the position of a football coach. He worked as an assistant head coach of MŠK Žilina, as well as head coach of U-19 and reserve teams. He worked as an assistant to head coach Dariusz Kubicki in Podbeskidzie Bielsko-Biała in Poland in Ekstraklasa. From October 2015 he was a head coach of the team OFK Teplička nad Váhom, participant in II. league (DOXXbet league). He led to save the team in II. league. From October 2015 he was a head coach of the team MFK Frýdek-Místek (II. ligue), Czech Republic. He led to save the team in II. league. From 2017 to February 2020 he was head coach of A team Telen Vision, Zimbabwe. From January to July 2020, he worked in the FC Nitra team as an assistant and head coach. From 1 Jun 2021 is Miroslav Nemec head coach in the MFK Zemplín Michalovce team.

European club matches 
 2003/2004: FK Matador Púchov: UEFA Cup (4 matches/2 goals—FC Sioni Bolnisi, FC Barcelona)
 2002/2003: MŠK Žilina: Champions League (2 matches—FC Basel 1893)
 2000/2001: 1. FK Košice: UEFA Cup (2 matches—GAK Graz)

Achievements 

 2008 (MŠK Žilina): participation at group stage of the UEFA Cup (assistant of head coach Dušan Radolský)
 2010 (MŠK Žilina): participation at group stage of the Champions League (assistant of head coach Pavel Hapal)
 2002, 2003 (MŠK Žilina): Slovak football champion (player's career)
 2007, 2010, 2012 (MŠK Žilina): Slovak football champion (assistant of head coach Pavel Vrba, Pavel Hapal, Frans Adelaar)
 2012 (MŠK Žilina): winner of Slovak Cup (assistant of head coach Frans Adelaar)

References

External links

1971 births
Living people
MŠK Žilina managers
MFK Zemplín Michalovce managers
Slovak footballers
F.C. Ashdod players
1. FC Tatran Prešov players
FC VSS Košice players
FC DAC 1904 Dunajská Streda players
MŠK Žilina players
MŠK Púchov players
FC Atyrau players
Israeli Premier League players
Kazakhstan Premier League players
Expatriate footballers in Israel
Expatriate footballers in Kazakhstan
Slovak expatriate sportspeople in Israel
Slovak expatriate sportspeople in Kazakhstan
Association football forwards
Slovak football managers
Sportspeople from Banská Bystrica